Ellis Walter Johnson (December 8, 1892 – January 14, 1965) was a pitcher in Major League Baseball, who appeared in eight games over three seasons for the Chicago White Sox and Philadelphia Athletics.

References

External links

1892 births
1965 deaths
Major League Baseball pitchers
Chicago White Sox players
Philadelphia Athletics players
Baseball players from Minneapolis
Racine Belles (1909–1915) players
Toronto Maple Leafs (International League) players
Venice Tigers players
Vernon Tigers players
Baltimore Orioles (IL) players